Anthony Grant may refer to:

Anthony Grant (priest) (1806–1883), English Anglican priest and Archdeacon of St Albans
Sir Anthony Grant (politician) (1925–2016), British Conservative politician
Anthony Grant (basketball) (born 1966), American basketball coach
Anthony Grant (footballer, born 1987), English football midfielder for Swindon Town
Anthony Grant (footballer, born 1989), Jamaican football forward for St. Louis Ambush

See also
Tony Grant (disambiguation)